This is a list of players who played at least one game for the Houston Aeros of the World Hockey Association from 1972–73 to 1977–78.

B
Bill Butters

C
Scott Campbell
Cam Connor

D
Gary Donaldson

F
Mike Fedorko

G
Ron Grahame
John Gray
Don Grierson

H
Larry Hale
Murray Hall
Ron Hansis
Duke Harris
Andre Hinse
Ed Hoekstra
Gordie Howe
Mark Howe
Marty Howe
Bill Hughes
Frank Hughes
John Hughes

I
Glen Irwin

K
Gordon Kannegiesser

L
Gord Labossiere
Andre Lacroix
Ray LaRose
Don Larway
Bob Liddington
Morris Lukowich
Larry Lund

M
John Mazur
Dunc McCallum
Brian McDonald
Al McLeod
Don McLeod
Keke Mortson

P
Dwayne Pentland
Jan Popiel
Poul Popiel
Bill Prentice
Rich Preston

R
Terry Ruskowski
Wayne Rutledge

S
John Schella
Jim Sherrit
Brian Smith
Jack Stanfield
Mike Stevens
Joe Szura

T
Ted Taylor
Paul Terbenche
John Tonelli

W
Ernie Wakely
Steve West
Gary Williamson

Z
Lynn Zimmerman

References
Houston Aeros (WHA) all-time player roster at hockeydb.com

Houston Aeros
Houston Aeros players
Houston Aeros players